Intervale is an unincorporated community in Carroll County, New Hampshire, located on the boundary between the towns of Bartlett and Conway in the White Mountains Region.  The village is part of the Mount Washington Valley, a resort area that also includes the communities of North Conway and Jackson. The village has a separate ZIP code (03845) from surrounding communities in the Bartlett/Conway area.

New Hampshire Route 16A leads north from Intervale through the village of Lower Bartlett. A state highway rest area with a fine view of Mount Washington and the Presidential Range is located along Routes 302 and 16 in Intervale.

A former trading post run by Abenaki chief Joseph Laurent, the Abenaki Indian Shop and Camp, is located in Intervale near the state highway rest area and is listed on the National Register of Historic Places.

See also
New Hampshire Historical Marker No. 38: White Mountain School of Art (marker is located at the Intervale Scenic Vista)

References

Unincorporated communities in New Hampshire
Unincorporated communities in Carroll County, New Hampshire
Bartlett, New Hampshire
Conway, New Hampshire